July's People is a 1981 novel by the South African writer Nadine Gordimer. It is set in a near-future version of South Africa where apartheid is ended through a civil war. Gordimer wrote the book before the end of apartheid as her prediction of how it would end. The book was banned in South Africa after its publication, and later under the post-apartheid government.

Plot
The novel is set during a fictional civil war in which black South Africans have violently overturned the system of apartheid. The story follows the Smales, a liberal White South African family who were forced to flee Johannesburg to the native village of their black servant, July.
Maureen tries working with the women in the fields, digging up leaves and roots. Afterwards, she goes to see July, who is working on the bakkie.

When July says she should not work with the women, she asks if he fears she will tell his wife about Ellen. He angrily asserts that she can only tell Martha that he has always been a good servant. Maureen, frightened, realizes that the dignity she thought she had always conferred upon him was actually humiliating to him. He informs her that he and the Smales have been summoned to the chief's village. Though July has authority in his village, they still must ask the chief's permission to stay. Maureen struggles with her new subservience to July.

After Gina goes to play with Nyiko and Bam goes with Victor and Royce to fish, a helicopter with unidentifiable markings flies over the village.

Reception
Anne Tyler, writing for The New York Times, praised the novel, saying that Gordimer "has outdone herself" and that the work was "So flawlessly written that every one of its events seems chillingly, ominously possible". In his book Frantz Fanon and the Future of Cultural Politics: Finding Something Different, Anthony C. Alessandrini referred to Tyler's take on the novel as "maddening" given that the "events" she describes result in the fall of apartheid.

Controversy

July's People was temporarily banned from schools in Gauteng Province, in South Africa, for a brief period in 2001. The government of Gauteng Province provided the following reason for the ban:

The book was banned alongside other books, including several Shakespeare plays, among them Julius Caesar and Othello.

References

1982 novels
20th-century South African novels
Historical novels
South African alternative history novels
Apartheid novels
Novels by Nadine Gordimer
Novels set in South Africa
Censored books